Rocky Fork State Park may refer to:

Rocky Fork State Park (Ohio)
Rocky Fork State Park (Tennessee)